Oyinkansola Sarah Aderibigbe (born 14 June 2002), known professionally as Ayra Starr, is a Beninese-born Nigerian singer. She began a fashion career at the age of 16 with Quove Model Management before deciding to pursue a career in music. After covering several songs by popular artists on Instagram, she posted her first original song on her page in December 2019. This brought her to the attention of record executive Don Jazzy, who signed her to his record label Mavin Records.

In early 2021, Ayra Starr achieved mainstream recognition with her eponymous debut extended play and its hit track "Away", which spent two consecutive weeks at number four on Nigeria's TurnTable Top 50 chart; the song also peaked at number 17 on the Billboard Top Triller Global chart, paving the way for the release of her first full-length mixtape, 19 & Dangerous (2021). Categorized mainly as Afropop and R&B, the mixtape received favorable critical reception and spawned two top forty hits in Nigeria. The lead single "Bloody Samaritan" peaked atop the Top 50 chart, becoming the first solo song by a female artist to reach the number-one position. Starr debuted on Pandora Predictions chart, and on 28 August 2021, was ranked number three on Billboards Next Big Sound.

Ayra Starr would later achieve mainstream international recognition in 2022, with the release of her song "Rush". The song charted in several territories, including Switzerland, Ireland and the United Kingdom, where it peaked at Number 36.

With the song, Ayra became the Youngest African Female Artist to surpass 100 Million views on a single video on YouTube, and also the first to do so within 5 months.  She also set a new record by becoming the only Nigerian Female Artist to have charted a solo song on UK official Singles Chart.

Early life 

Oyinkansola Sarah Aderibigbe was born on 14 June, 2002 in Cotonou, Benin, and grew up there and in Lagos, Nigeria. She was born to Nigerian parents from Kwara State and has four siblings. Her family moved frequently during her high school years because of her father's business, and as a result she had a hard time forming close friends.

Having been raised in a music-loving family, her interest in singing comes mostly from her family. At the age of 10, she sang in a high school choir and began writing songs with her brother. She attended Les Cours Sonou University and received a BA degree in international relations and political science. During her college years, she was often bullied by her classmates because of her age and appearance. To counter the feelings, she experienced from being taunted, Ayra Starr turned to music. "I would listen to Nicki Minaj on my way to school, and I'd feel like the second Nicki Minaj." Ayra Starr's mother was very supportive of her musical ambitions, and always encouraged her to pursue a singing career.

Career

2018–present: Career beginnings, Ayra Starr and 19 & Dangerous 

In August 2018, Starr was signed with Quove Models, a modelling agency based in Lagos. From there, she modelled for companies such as Mazelle Studio, Complete Fashion Magazine and Esperanza Woman. In 2019, she began posting covers of songs by artists like Andra Day and 2Face Idibia online. She chose her stage name because, in her words, "it means woke and eye-opening and that's what I stand for." She appeared in the music video for Eri Ife's song "Dear Future Wife." In December 2019, she uploaded an original song called "Damage" on her Instagram page. This was heard by thousands of people including label executive Don Jazzy and led to her first recording contract with Mavin Records.

In 2020, she started recording at Mavin Studios in Lagos with producers Louddaaa and Don Jazzy. Her self-titled debut extended play was released on 22 January, 2021 through Mavin Records. The album has been described as "a topsy-turvy chronicle of love or love-themed situations" and "merges elements of R&B/neo-soul with Afropop percussion." Ayra Starr said her intention with the record was to make music that would resonate with both young and old listeners. The mixing and mastering of the EP was by Ikon, Louddaaa and Johnny Drille. Starr wrote one of the songs on the EP alone, and co-wrote the remaining four with her brother Dami. Shortly after its release, the EP became the number-one album on Nigeria iTunes and Apple Music. As of March 2021, it has reached the same position on Apple Music in 4 other countries, racking up over 15 million streams across Spotify, YouTube and Audio Mack. The project spawned the hit track "Away" which peaked at number four on Nigeria's TurnTable Top 50 and number 17 on US Billboard Top Triller Global. Its accompanying music video also debuted on MTV Base's Official Naija Top 10. OkayAfrica included the song in their list of The 9 Best Nigerian Songs of January 2021. Ayra Starr released remix versions of "Ija" and "Away" featuring Tokimonsta and Lilo respectively between March and April. Around the same time, Crayon's EP Twelve A.M was released with her vocals on the track "In Sync." She performed at the UC Berkeley Nigerian Students Association virtual culture show titled The Olori Awards. On 28 April 2021, the official music video for her song "DITR" was released on YouTube via Mavin. In June 2021, the music video for another song titled "Sare", was released. Both music videos were directed by Afolabi Olalekan.

On 11 July 2021, Ayra Starr performed for the season finale of Nigerian Idol. On 6 August 2021, her debut studio album, titled 19 & Dangerous was released. For the album, she worked with her previous collaborators Louddaaa and Don Jazzy, both of whom contributed production on her EP Ayra Starr, and new collaborators, London and Andre Vibez. The album marked her first time recording alongside guest artists such as Fousheé and CKay. It was met with favorable critical reception with most critics characterizing its sound as primarily Afropop and R&B. It spawned two top forty hits on the TurnTable Top 50, the highest being "Bloody Samaritan", its lone single, which became Starr's first number-one single on the chart. The song climbed the Top 50 for several weeks, and, on the chart dated 27 September 2021, it reached the number one spot, making Ayra Starr the first female artist to do so with a solo single. She debuted on Pandora Predictions chart, and on 28 August 2021, she ranked number two on the Billboards Next Big Sound. She was featured on "in the light", a track on Johnny Drille's Before We Fall Asleep. On 4 September 2021, she was named brand ambassador for Pepsi Nigeria. The following day, Starr performed during a live eviction episode of Big Brother Naija. She collaborated with Cheque on "Dangerous", the second track on his album Bravo. At the 8th African Muzik Magazine Awards, she was nominated for Best Newcomer award. 

On March 4, 2023, Ayra Starr took to social media to announce her music was used as soundtrack for blockbuster American action movie, Creed III.

Artistry

Musical style 
Although musically diverse, Ayra Starr's sound has predominantly been categorized as Afropop and R&B. Her voice has been described in the media as "silky", "cozy", "delicate", "sturdy", "arresting" and "soulful", with music critics noting the dynamic nature of her range and emotional delivery. Her lyrics are a mixture of English, Nigerian Pidgin English and Yoruba, often exploring contemporary topics such as love, relationship, empowerment and freedom.

With the release of her debut eponymous EP, some critics felt that her vocal technique bore a striking resemblance to Tems' musical style. In an interview with Cool FM, Ayra Starr spoke about comparisons to Tems: "I'm a young artist and Tems is an amazing musician, for people to compare me to such an amazing musician, it's a compliment and I'm honoured." Motolani Alake, in his review of the EP for Pulse wrote that "Ayra Starr isn't exactly a replica of Tems, but when she manipulates her vocals to stress the final syllable on words, sentences and cadences by flexing her octaves, she definitely sounds like Tems." Alake also opined that both artists are different and that "Tems can be more alternative while Starr is more Nigerian and more Afropop with more lamba in her soul." Schön! Magazines Thandie Sibanda called the EP "a coming-of-age jukebox." Karen Chalamilla of The Floor remarked that Ayra Starr "not only solidifies the singer/songwriter as a standout vocalist, but also serves as an acute window into her artistic sensibilities."

In a review for 19 & Dangerous, Oris Aigbokhaevbolo of Music In Africa described Starr as an evolving artist and praised her singing abilities, adding that it's clear she "can work across genres while not quite sounding like anybody else." 19 & Dangerous retains the Afropop-R&B sound of her previous record, but it also incorporates influences from genres such as neo-soul, Jazz and EDM.

Influences 
Ayra Starr grew up in a musically inclined family. She considers her mother, a former singer and her brother Dami, a guitarist and songwriter as her earliest inspirations for her interest in a music career. Growing up between Bénin and Nigeria, she was exposed to different cultures that influenced her perspective on life and her personality. Ayra Starr and Dami began writing songs from a very young age under the tutelage of their mother and aunt. She had wanted to make a real career out of singing since age 10 but her father encouraged her to complete her education first.

In her interviews for local and international media, she stated that throughout her childhood, she had a wide range of musical influences, including 2Face Idibia, Wande Coal, Angélique Kidjo, Lijadu Sisters and Tope Alabi, and in college, Nicki Minaj, Justin Bieber, Sia and Tiwa Savage. She credited Shakira as her biggest influence vocally along with Beyoncé, Rihanna and Miley Cyrus: "It was just the power I would feel listening to their music. We didn't get a lot of Nigerian female singers singing strongly about things like them, not as we do now." Lyrically, she admires Aṣa and has said that she "wrote so beautifully [and] was one of those people [she] would listen to just to learn how to write properly."

Other ventures 

In September 2021, Starr became a brand ambassador for Pepsi Nigeria.

Starr was featured in the October 2021 issue of Accelerate TV's The Cover. Starr was featured in the Fall/Winter 2021 issue of ODDA. In 2021, she appeared in a Notion editorial.

Discography 
Studio albums
19 & Dangerous (2021)

EPs
Ayra Starr (2021)

Charting singles

Guest appearances

Awards and nominations

References

External links 

Living people
2002 births
People from Cotonou
Beninese women singers
Nigerian soul singers
Nigerian women pop singers
Nigerian rhythm and blues singers
Nigerian women singer-songwriters
21st-century Nigerian women singers
Singers from Lagos
Yoruba women musicians
Yoruba-language singers